Peter of Zittau (–1339) was a Bohemian churchman and historian. Born in Zittau, he entered the Cistercian monastery of Aula Regia (Zbraslav), founded by Wenceslaus II in 1292, and became the monastery's official historian. He is the primary author of the Chronicon Aulae Regiae. Esteemed by his colleagues, in 1316 Peter was elected the second abbot of Aula Regia. In this capacity he took part in the election of King John and staunchly opposed Henry of Carinthia. He later grew disenchanted with John, but wrote a lengthy lament for the passing of his wife, Elizabeth, the "true heiress of Bohemia" (vera heres Boemiae), in 1330.

Notes

Sources

1339 deaths
Cistercian abbots
14th-century historians from the Holy Roman Empire
14th-century Bohemian people
Year of birth uncertain
14th-century German writers
14th-century Latin writers